Gino Jennings (born February 10, 1963) is an African American religious leader, known for establishing the fundamentalist and Holiness denomination—the First Church of Our Lord Jesus Christ, Inc.—in Philadelphia, Pennsylvania, embracing Oneness Pentecostalism.

Biography 
Born on February 10, 1963, in Philadelphia, Pennsylvania, Gino Jennings began his ministry initially as a Bible reader for his uncle in church before becoming a child preacher at the age of 13. During his adolescence, Jennings claimed that God appeared to him after a period of prayer and fasting, leading to the eventual establishment of the First Church of Our Lord Jesus Christ, Inc. after receiving divine revelation.

Starting the church in his parent's basement in 1984, the First Church of Our Lord Jesus Christ, Inc. grew through teaching doctrines of inner and outward holiness, Jesus' name-only baptism, and baptism with the Holy Spirit alongside required evidence of glossolalia—teachings common among Oneness Pentecostals and others descending from the Holiness movement. By 2016, Jennings and his First Church of Our Lord Jesus Christ, Inc. acquired its headquarters in Philadelphia, with numerous churches spread throughout the United States and elsewhere globally.

Through leading this newly founded Christian denomination, Gino Jennings has become subject to international controversy. Many people of other Christian denominations and churches have criticized Jennings and the First Church of Our Lord Jesus Christ movement for some of their stricter beliefs and views, such as their near-total rejection of women as clergy based on 1st Timothy 2:12 alongside a traditionally conservative dress code with headcoverings, long skirts, or long dresses, and rejecting makeup and jewelry—teachings which many Christians and others have accused them of being "religiously misogynistic"; rebutting, Jennings defended his statements by saying not to listen to how he sounds, but to what he says in defense of his interpretations on biblical modesty.

Presenting a staunch advocacy for nontrinitarianism, Jennings has also been known for rejecting and advocating forgoing the usage of the term "Christianity", for he believes that "Christianity" is not a term found in the Bible, unlike the term “Christian”. Instead the word Jennings believes more accurately describes his congregation's faith should be the term "Holiness," or the "religion of Holiness", although among early Christians, the faith despite the term "Christianity" was simply known as "the Way". He has even attracted additional criticism for advocating a very fundamentalist Christian exclusivism via divine revelation for his denomination.

In 2018, Jennings agreed to meet Jamaican entertainer Mr. Vegas for a debate. During the debate, Jennings had Vegas escorted out of the building by security after an altercation that ensued between Vegas, the church's audio and visual team, and the other associate ministers on the pulpit. This later led to the debate going viral throughout Jamaica, and two other ministers that agreed to debate him canceled. In 2019, Jennings was banned from Australia.

See also 

 Holiness movement
 J. Delano Ellis
 Joseph Smith, founder of the Latter Day Saint movement after receiving divine revelation
 Oneness Pentecostalism
 Restorationism

References 

1963 births
Living people
American Pentecostal pastors
Christian fundamentalists
Nontrinitarian Christians
Nontrinitarian denominations
People from Philadelphia